HS Produkt d.o.o. is a Croatian firearms manufacturing company, best known for design and production of the HS2000 and XDM series of semi-automatic pistols, which are sold in the United States market by Springfield Armory, Inc., under their XD, XD-S, XD-M, and Hellcat brandings.

History 
HS Produkt was founded as IM Metal in 1991, after the first democratic election in the Republic of Croatia. Since company founding its headquarters was situated in the town of Ozalj, Croatia, about 50 kilometers southwest of the capital Zagreb, and its manufacturing facility was relocated to Karlovac in 2000.

At the beginning of 2001, following the success of the HS2000 pistols on the world market, the company changed its name to HS Produkt.

HS Produkt's current production facility produces about 30,000 pistols per month with a trend of continued growth; ninety percent of production is exported to the United States. The number of employees rose from around 80 in 2000 to nearly 1000 in 2007, making HS Produkt the leading employer in Karlovac County.

Founders and co-owners of HS Produkt, Ivan Žabčić and Marko Vuković, are both mechanical engineers; Vuković is the chief designer behind most of the company's products. Vuković also has combat experience as a veteran of the Croatian War of Independence, in which he was wounded twice.

HS Produkt is in 2016, one of the suppliers competing for the replacement of French army rifles alongside manufacturers such as Beretta (Italy), FN Herstal (Belgium), Swiss Arms (Switzerland) and Heckler & Koch (Germany).

Products

Early products

 PHP (Prvi Hrvatski Pištolj), a semi-automatic pistol, manufactured from 1991 to 1994 was the company's first design. It was based on Walther P38, with some features common with Beretta 92.

 HS95 (Hrvatski Samokres 95) was the second handgun model, described as an unlicensed copy of the SIG Sauer P226 with some original external features.

These early all-metal pistols were considered solid designs, but were plagued by quality issues due in large part to the difficulties of manufacturing during wartime.

HS2000 pistol 

The company's most successful product, the HS2000 (Hrvatski Samokres 2000) polymer-framed semi-automatic pistol, was HS Produkt's third pistol in a series developed on the basis of experience gained during the Croatian War of Independence. It was introduced in 1999. It is marketed in the US by Springfield Armory, Inc. as the XD (eXtreme Duty) series.

The pistol is the standard sidearm of the Croatian Armed Forces and Police.

Hellcat pistol 
This micro-compact polymer-framed semi-automatic pistol is produced by HS Produkt and marketed by Springfield Armory, Inc., as the Hellcat. Its original name is HS Produkt H11. It was designed as a concealed carry weapon, similar to SIG Sauer P365.

VHS assault rifle 

VHS assault rifle is a 5.56×45mm NATO bullpup select-fire weapon that was first introduced at the 2007 iKA, the annual Croatian innovation display that takes place in the city of Karlovac. The development was carried on following a request of the Croatian Army for a new infantry rifle to update the individual equipment to NATO standards.

On 19 November 2007, the Croatian Ministry of Defence placed an order for an experimental batch of 50 rifles to be tested by the Croatian contingent currently deployed in Afghanistan within the ISAF. Full-scale production began towards the end of 2008, when field testing completed. Other nations, including Kuwait and Venezuela have shown interest in acquiring the rifle.

On 12 May 2009, the Croatian Minister of Defence Branko Vukelić confirmed the positive end of a torture test over the rifle and on 15 May officially signed a contract with HS Produkt for the acquisition of 20,000 rifle kits (both versions) for a medium price of 14,503 Croatian kunas each (as of December 8, 2018, approximately 2233.70 USD or 1961.52 EUR).

A new and improved version of the VHS rifle, known as the VHS-2, was introduced in April 2013. It introduced a new, more conventional fire selector, a redesigned carrying handle, an adjustable-length buttstock, and an ambidextrous cartridge casings ejection system that can be configured for either right or left side ejection in less than a minute. Both rifles come in two barrel lengths designated as D (long) and K (carbine) variants. Both rifles can be equipped with 40x46mm VHS-BG grenade launcher.

Notes

References

External links

 

Manufacturing companies established in 1991
Firearm manufacturers of Croatia
Privately held companies
Karlovac County
Croatian brands
Croatian companies established in 1991